Cymbopogon bombycinus, or citronella grass  (also called silky oil grass) is a species of perennial grass in the family Poaceae that is native to Australia.

Description
Cymbopogon bombycinus is a tufted perennial bunchgrass, without stolons or rhizomes.

The crushed leaf gives off a strong citrus-like scent.

Taxonomy
The species name bombycinus is derived from the Greek "bombyx" and "bombykos", meaning "silk" or "silk-garment", referring to the silky hairs of the spikelets. The name is also derived from the Latin "bombyx" and "bycis", meaning "silk" or "silk-worm", referring to the same silky hairs.

Habitat and ecology
Cymbopogon bombycinus is found mostly in southwestern areas of Australia, in tropical and subtropical regions of Queensland, New South Wales, the Northern Territory, and Western Australia. The species occurs on sandy and stony soils along stream banks or on alluvial flats, and occasionally in eucalyptus woodlands.

Uses
Aboriginal peoples of Australia burn and rub the plant on the body for colds and pain, and soak the plant in water and use the liquid to treat sore eyes. The plant is also eaten in the summer despite its strong aromatic scent, but the plants becomes harsh as it ages and is seldom eaten old.

References

bombycinus
Bunchgrasses of Australasia
Endemic flora of Australia
Poales of Australia
Medicinal plants of Australia